The spur-winged lapwing or spur-winged plover (Vanellus spinosus) is a lapwing species, one of a group of largish waders in the family Charadriidae.

It is one of several species of wader supposed to be the "trochilus" bird said by Herodotus to have been involved in an unattested cleaning symbiosis with the Nile crocodile.

Distribution
The spur-winged lapwing breeds around the eastern Mediterranean, and in a wide band from sub-Saharan west Africa to Arabia. The Greek and Turkish breeders are migratory, but other populations are resident. The species is declining in its northern range, but is abundant in much of tropical Africa, being seen at almost any wetland habitat in its range. The spur-winged lapwing is one of the species to which the Agreement on the Conservation of African-Eurasian Migratory Waterbirds applies.

In eastern and southern Africa the species has seen a range increase, entering Zambia for the first time in 1999 and spreading south and west.

Description
These are conspicuous and unmistakable birds. They are medium-large waders with black crown, chest, foreneck stripe and tail. The face, the rest of the neck and belly are white and the wings and back are light brown. The bill and legs are black. Its striking appearance is supplemented by its noisy nature, with a loud did-he-do-it call. The bird's common name refers to a small claw or spur hidden in each of its wings.

Ecology and behaviour
This species has a preference for marshes and similar freshwater wetland habitats. The food of the spur-winged lapwing is insects and other invertebrates, which are picked from the ground.

It lays four blotchy yellowish eggs on a ground scrape. The spur-winged lapwing is known to sometimes use the wing-claws in an attack on animals and, rarely, people, who get too close to the birds' exposed offspring.

Supposed cleaning symbiosis

The "spur-winged plover" was identified by Henry Scherren as the "trochilus" bird said by the Greek historian Herodotus to be involved in what would now be called a cleaning symbiosis with the Nile crocodile. However, there is no reliable evidence that this or any other species in fact has such a relationship, although Cott does record that spur-winged plovers are the birds that most often feed around basking crocodiles, and are tolerated by them.

Gallery

References

External links

 
 
 
 
 
 

spur-winged lapwing
Birds of Sub-Saharan Africa
Birds of the Middle East
spur-winged lapwing
spur-winged lapwing